Mythos Games was a British video game developer company founded by Julian Gollop with his brother Nick in 1988 as Target Games. It is best known for its 1994 strategy game X-COM: UFO Defense. Following the closing of Mythos Games in 2001, Gollop founded Codo Technologies.

Games

References

External links
Official website via Internet Archive

Companies based in Essex
Video game companies established in 1988
Video game companies disestablished in 2001
1988 establishments in England
2001 disestablishments in England
Defunct video game companies of the United Kingdom
Video game development companies
Defunct companies of England